San Polo is the 16th-century Roman Catholic parish church located on Via all Chiesa #10 in the town of Podenzano, Province of Piacenza, region of Emilia-Romagna, Italy.

History
The layout of the parish church we see today dates to 1520. The first church on the site was razed and burned by the troops of Galeazzo Visconti in 1321. The neoclassical-style façade and interiors was refurbished in 1843. The interiors were frescoed by Alberto Aspetti and Nazareno Sidoli.

References

16th-century Roman Catholic church buildings in Italy
Churches in the province of Piacenza
Roman Catholic churches in Emilia-Romagna
Neoclassical architecture in Emilia-Romagna
Neoclassical church buildings in Italy